Sleepwalk with Me is a 2012 American independent comedy film co-written by, directed by, and starring Mike Birbiglia. It also stars Lauren Ambrose, James Rebhorn, Carol Kane, and Cristin Milioti. Before making the film, Birbiglia had already told the autobiographical story of his struggles to become a stand-up comedian while dealing with REM behavior disorder and a failing relationship in a one-man show and a book.

The film had its world premiere at the Sundance Film Festival on January 23, 2012, where it won the Best of NEXT Audience Award, and was released theatrically in the United States by IFC Films on August 24, 2012.

Plot
While driving, Matt Pandamiglio tells a story that begins with him, although he still has reservations, moving in with his girlfriend of eight years, Abby.

At his sister Janet's engagement party, several of Matt's relatives ask when he is getting married, and that night he sleepwalks for the first time. Abby tells Matt she finds his complete lack of interest in marriage to be weird, and Matt relates how he is the one who initially pursued her, but it is she who was responsible for most of the subsequent progression in their relationship. Matt is surprised to find the TiVo full of wedding-themed shows, so he talks with Janet, and she tells him that maybe he and Abby should take a "breather".

At the comedy club where Matt tends bar, he is about to talk to Abby about taking a breather when some friends show up with their baby and his boss, Ron, offers him some time on the stage. After his set, much of which consists of material he has been doing since college, Matt talks to a comedian who complains about the entertainment industry and his agent, Colleen. Ignoring the complaints, Matt goes over to Colleen and, with help from Abby, gets her card.

That night, Matt does not want to have sex with Abby after she has been talking about babies, and he sleepwalks again, falling off of a dresser. His father is worried about him and tells Matt to see a sleep specialist, but Matt minimizes the problem.

Colleen meets with Matt and, after initially trying to brush him off, books him for a low-paying gig that night at a college upstate after he says he has a car. Skipping work, Matt is told at the college that they forgot they booked a comedian and offer to let him emcee a lip sync contest. It is poorly-attended, but Matt enjoys getting paid to perform and staying in a motel.

The next day, Matt opens for Marc Mulheren. He struggles, but, afterward, Marc talks to Matt and laughs at something he says about his relationship, saying he should repeat it on stage. When Matt takes this advice, he finally gets some laughs. Excited, he calls Abby, but she is out with friends and they have trouble understanding each other. He hangs out with three other comedians and sleeps on their couch, though he wakes up in the shower.

Over time, Matt refines his act all over the northeastern U.S. One night, a waitress comes on to him, and they end up having sex in his car. He feels guilty at Janet's wedding the next day, and he does not know what to say when his mother asks if he wants Abby to be in the pictures of the bride's family. After riding home in silence, Abby goes out and returns drunk. She says they should break up if Matt never wants to get married and starts to pack her things. Matt finds himself proposing to her, and she eventually accepts.

Matt's sleepwalking intensifies, and Abby begins to push him to see a doctor, but he is scared, and instead incorporates jokes about his condition into his act. Abby begins to plan the wedding, and one night, after his mother sends him a picture of Abby's wedding dress, Matt jumps out a hotel window while asleep and has to have shards of glass removed from his legs. When he gets home, he tells Abby that he does not want to get married, and they break up.

Back in his car, Matt says that, when he was preparing to make this film, he went to visit Abby, who is now married with two children, to ask why she stayed with him so long, and she said she did not want to hurt him. He arrives at a comedy club and performs the story he has just narrated, telling the audience that he finally saw a sleep specialist and was diagnosed with REM behavior disorder. Now, he follows a sleep routine, takes medication, and sleeps in a sleeping bag to restrict his movement. Although he is not "cured", he says that is okay.

Cast

Mike Birbiglia as Matt Pandamiglio, a struggling stand-up comedian
Lauren Ambrose as Abby, Matt's long-term girlfriend, who is a voice coach
James Rebhorn as Frank Pandamiglio, Matt's father
Carol Kane as Linda Pandamiglio, Matt's mother
Cristin Milioti as Janet Pandamiglio, Matt's sister
Aya Cash as Hannah, Matt and Abby's friend, Pete's wife, and a new mother
Marylouise Burke as Aunt Lucille, Matt's aunt
Loudon Wainwright III as Uncle Max, Matt's uncle
Ben Levin as Philip, Janet's fiancé
Henry Phillips as Henry, a comedian Matt befriends
Jessi Klein as Lynn, a comedian Matt befriends
Emily Meade as Samantha, a waitress
Danny Borbon as Tommy, who appears on Wedding Tales and in Matt's dreams
Amanda Perez as Tammy, who appears on Wedding Tales and in Matt's dreams
Kristen Schaal as Cynthia, the organizer of a lip sync contest Matt emcees
Alex Karpovsky as Ian, a comedian who performs at Ron's club
Ron Nakahara as Ron, the owner of the comedy club where Matt tends bar
Wyatt Cenac as Chris, a comedian Matt befriends
Marc Maron as Marc Mulheren, a comedian for whom Matt is an opening act
David Wain as Pete, Matt and Abby's friend, Hannah's husband, and a new father
Dr. William C. Dement as himself, a sleep researcher
Sondra James as Colleen, Ian and Matt's agent
John Lutz as Chip, an employee at La Quinta Inns & Suites

Ira Glass, who co-wrote and produced the film, has a cameo appearance as the photographer at Janet and Philip's wedding.

Background
In 2008, Mike Birbiglia's one-man show Sleepwalk with Me opened off-Broadway at the Bleecker Street Theater. The show, which was presented by Nathan Lane, blended stand-up comedy with theater and was a critical success. The New York Times called it "simply perfect", and Time Out New York named it their "Show of the Year" for 2009. Birbiglia's performance of an excerpt from the one-man show at The Moth was used as the first act of "Fear of Sleep", the August 8, 2008, episode of This American Life, and the host of This American Life, Ira Glass, ended up working with Birbiglia to write and produce the film.

After writing the one-man show, Birbiglia wrote the book Sleepwalk With Me & Other Painfully True Stories, which debuted at number 29 on The New York Times''' hardcover nonfiction bestseller list in October 2010 and was a finalist for the 2011 Thurber Prize for American Humor.

Release
The film premiered at the 2012 Sundance Film Festival in the NEXT category, and IFC Films acquired its distribution rights soon after. It screened at the South By Southwest Film Festival, was the opening night film at the Independent Film Festival of Boston, and was the centerpiece film at the Nantucket Film Festival, where it won the award for Best Writer/Director. Also appearing at the Seattle International Film Festival, the Lighthouse International Film Festival, and the Provincetown International Film Festival, it was the opening night film at BAMcinemaFest in Brooklyn, NY, where it sold out BAM's Opera House.

The first weekend of its limited theatrical release in the United States, Sleepwalk with Me set records for the IFC Center's biggest opening weekend, as well as the highest per-screen average for a first-time American filmmaker.

Reception
On review aggregator website Rotten Tomatoes, the film holds an 84% approval rating based on 117 reviews, with an average rating of 7.1/10; the site's "critics consensus" reads: "Laugh-out-loud funny and endearingly messy, Sleepwalk with Me overcomes its tonal inconsistencies to deliver a sweetly melancholic, amiably reassuring indie crowd-pleaser." On Metacritic, the film has a weighted average score of 71 out of 100 based on reviews from 28 critics, indicating "generally favorable reviews."Sleepwalk With Me'' has been nominated for awards and named to many year-end lists. Birbiglia was nominated for Breakthrough Actor at the Gotham Independent Film Awards, and the film was nominated for Best Art House Film by the St. Louis Film Critics Association. It was also named one of the Top Ten Independent Films of 2012 by the National Board of Review, was voted Laughspin readers' favorite comedy film of the year, and was #27 on Huffington Post's Best Films of 2012 list, with Mike Ryan calling it "the funniest movie of the year."  Film.com named the film #11 on their 100 Best Films of 2012 list, writing: "Veteran comedian/first-time director Mike Birbiglia does something that Billy Crystal, Woody Allen, and Judd Apatow were never able to quite pull off: Making a film that honestly portrays the life of a stand-up."

References

External links
 IFC Films
 

2012 films
This American Life
Films directed by Mike Birbiglia
2012 directorial debut films
2010s English-language films
American independent films
American comedy films
2010s American films